Hylaeamys oniscus, the sowbug rice rat, is a rodent species in the family Cricetidae. It was formerly placed in the genus Oryzomys as Oryzomys oniscus.

It occurs only in northeastern Brazil. It is close to Hylaeamys laticeps, which occurs further south in Brazil, and the two have been considered to be the same species.

References

Hylaeamys
Rodents of South America
Mammals of Brazil
Endemic fauna of Brazil
Mammals described in 1904
Taxa named by Oldfield Thomas